The Super-class ferries are a class of , 144-car ferries built in 1967 for Washington State Ferries.

History 
The Super-class ferry was designed to complement the smaller  ferries, as well as to replace the aging . The design of the Super class was done in Seattle by W.C. Nickum and Sons, a naval architectural firm, and Washington State Ferries. Funding for the Super-class ferry design and construction was made available by the United States Department of Housing and Urban Development (HUD), and state and federal funds. Once the design was complete, a low bid was accepted by the National Steel and Shipbuilding Company in San Diego, California, which constructed all four vessels over a period of two years.

The Super class was to designed to accommodate the rapidly expanding population growth in Puget Sound, especially in the Bremerton and Bainbridge Island areas. Each vessel was rated with a  top speed, which was relatively unheard of in large ferries at the time. All four vessels in the class feature a two-level passenger deck and a vast sun deck with full access via sheltered outdoor stairwells at both ends of the vessel, indoor staircases via both passenger decks, and elevators which were later added to meet ADA requirements.

The Super class was displaced on the Seattle–Bainbridge route less than five years later by the even larger  ferries. Starting in 2019, the Super class was replaced by the  ferries.

Ferries 
The Super class consisted of four vessels. As of September 2021, two of those vessels are still in active service, and the other two have been retired.

The class consists of:
  – retired June 30, 2019
  – in active service as of September 2021
  – in active service as of September 2021
  – retired April 17, 2020

References

External links 
Washington State Ferries class information
archived copy of Washington State Ferries history from 2017

Washington State Ferries vessel classes
Ferry classes